The Bidadari Garden (also known as Bidadari Memorial Garden) was a memorial garden once located along Veron Road in Bidadari, Singapore.

History
The site was once the part of Hindu section of the Bidadari Cemetery before exhumation took place from 2001 to 2006. During the exhuming process of the cemetery, a memorial park known as the Bidadari Garden was established on this site by the National Heritage Board in 2004 to commemorate the history of the Bidadari Cemetery.

The former gates and gateposts from the former Bidadari Cemetery were moved to this memorial garden and formed as its entrance. 21 of the selected headstones from the former cemetery were also relocated there. The memorial garden comprised various sections to represent the Christian, Muslim and Hindu sections of the old cemetery.

In August 2013, the Housing and Development Board announced plans for the future Bidadari housing estate and worked closely with National Heritage Board and National Parks Board to relocate and integrate the memorial garden with the Bidadari Park. The memorial garden eventually closed on 10 June 2019 to make way for further developments.

Gallery

References

Demolished buildings and structures in Singapore
Parks in Singapore
Places in Singapore
Toa Payoh